Aurélien Wiik (born 24 September 1980) is a French actor and filmmaker. He is the son of a Norwegian father and of the French actress Françoise Deldick.

Life and career

Acting career
He made his cinematic acting debut at the age of twelve, playing Antoine in the 1994 film Cache cash, directed by Claude Pinoteau. In 1997, he played "Pierrot" in Roger Hanin's film Soleil, starring Sophia Loren, Philippe Noiret and Marianne Sägebrecht. In 2004, he played Jean Lupin in Arsène Lupin, starring Romain Duris and Kristin Scott Thomas. In 2005, he appeared in four films, including: À travers la forêt, directed by Jean-Paul Civeyrac, and Tu vas rire, mais je te quitte, directed by Philippe Harel. In 2006, he was in Sans Elle, directed by Jean Beaudin.

Directing career
He made his directorial debut in 2005 with Rue des vertus.

Theatre
Wiik's debut stage role was in a 1994 production of Henri de Montherlant's play La Ville dont le prince est un enfant (as the boy Serge Souplier), at the Théâtre Hébertot in Paris. In 2003 he was the student Loïc in the popular comedy Les Amazones by Jean-Marie Chevret which had a long run at the Théâtre Rive Gauche in Paris (and also filmed for television), and in 2005 and 2007 he took the title role in the second and third revivals of L'Autre by Florian Zeller staged at the Théâtre des Mathurins, Paris. Then in 2013 he was in the premiere of Mensonges d'états about Operation Fortitude by Xavier Daugreilh, and in a 2018 revival of La Conversation (as Napoléon Bonaparte) by Jean d'Ormesson directed by Alain Sachs.

Partial filmography

1993: Arène (Short, director: Nicolas Cuche)
1994: Cache cash (director: Claude Pinoteau) - Antoine
1997: Soleil (director: Roger Hanin) - Pierrot
1999: Belle Maman (director: Gabriel Aghion)
1999: Sous-sols (Short, director: Jérôme Le Maire) - Ben
2000: In extremis (director: Étienne Faure), Vincent
2000: Carla (Short, director: Dramane Sangare) - le chauffeur
2001: Chaos (director: Coline Serreau) - Fabrice
2002: La Bande du drugstore (director: François Armanet) - Marc Bensoussan
2002: Les frères Hélias (Short, director: Frédy Busso) - Nico
2002: Parlez-moi d'amour (director: Sophie Marceau) - William
2002: A l'abri des regards indiscrets (Short) - the playboy #2
2003: Sem Ela (director: Anna da Palma) - Johnny Vieira
2004: Ce qu'ils imaginent (director: Anne Théron) - Santiago
2004: Tout le plaisir est pour moi (director: Isabelle Broué) - Raoul
2004: Arsène Lupin (director: Jean-Paul Salomé) - Jean Lupin
2004: Amazon Forever (director: Jean-Pierre Dutilleux) - Nicolas
2005: Tu vas rire mais je te quitte (director: Philippe Harel) - Thierry
2005: Au petit matin (Short, director: Xavier Gens)
2005: À travers la forêt (director: Jean-Paul Civeyrac) - Renaud / Hippolyte
2006: Sans elle... (director: Anna da Palma) - Johnny
2007: Mise à nu (director: Jérémy Halkin)
2007: Frontière(s) (director: Xavier Gens) - Alex
2008: La tangente (Short, director: Vincent Vesco) - Lui
2008: Secret défense (director: Philippe Haim) - Jérémy
2008: A Man and His Dog (director: Francis Huster) - Leïla's colleague
2009: Des illusions (director: Etienne Faure) - Florent
2010: Djinns (directors: Hugues Martin and Sandra Martin) - Vincent
2010: Somewhere (director: Sofia Coppola) - French Guy
2014: The Vineyard (director: James Katz) - Etiene
2014: Blood Sugar Baby (director: Igal Weitzman) - Mirko
2015: Our Futures (director: Rémi Bezançon) - Vincent
2018: L'incroyable histoire du facteur Cheval (director: Nils Tavernier) - Benjamin Lecoeur

Television
He has as many television as film credits to his name. In 2000, he appeared in the first episode of Scénarios sur la drogue. In 1996, he was in the second episode of Season 5 for Julie Lescaut. In 1995, he played thirteen-year-old Benjamin in Season 1 of La Rivière Espérance.

1995: La Rivière Espérance (director: Josée Dayan) - Benjamin à 13 ans
1996: Les Feux de la Saint-Jean (director: François Luciani)
1999: Tombé du nid (TV Movie, director: Édouard Molinaro) - Max
2000: Scénarios sur la drogue (Episode 1, directed by Simon Leloouche) - L'adolescent
2005: Les Rois maudits (miniseries) - Edward III of England
2008-2009: Myster Mocky présente (Season 2:2, Season 3:1, director: Édouard Molinaro)
2019: Le Bazar de la Charité (TV Series, director: Alexandre Laurent) - Jean Rivière

Further reading
 Interview with Aurélien Wiik by Philippe Escalier for the magazine Je Paris, issue dated 1 November 2003

References

External links

 
 Official MySpace page
 Fandango filmography

French male film actors
French male television actors
French male stage actors
French male child actors
People from Calvados (department)
1980 births
Living people
French people of Norwegian descent
20th-century French male actors
21st-century French male actors
French film directors
French male screenwriters
French screenwriters